Tony Leone may refer to:

Tony Leone (musician)
Tony Leone (soccer)

See also
 Anthony Leone (disambiguation)
 Antonio Leone (disambiguation)